Boris Becker was the defending champion but lost in the semifinals to Pat Cash.

Ivan Lendl won in the final 6–4, 6–2, 6–4 against Cash.

Seeds

  Ivan Lendl (champion)
  Boris Becker (semifinals)
  Pat Cash (final)
  Slobodan Živojinović (semifinals)
  Scott Davis (quarterfinals)
  Wally Masur (first round)
  Ramesh Krishnan (quarterfinals)
  Paul Annacone (quarterfinals)

Draw

Finals

Section 1

Section 2

External links
 1987 Swan Premium Open draw

Singles